"Gott sei gelobet und gebenedeiet" (God be praised and blessed) is a Lutheran hymn of 1524 with words written by Martin Luther who used an older first stanza and melody. It is a song of thanks after communion. Luther's version in three stanzas was printed in the Erfurt Enchiridion of 1524 and in Johann Walter's choral hymnal Eyn geystlich Gesangk Buchleyn the same year. Today, the song appears in German hymnals, including both the Protestant Evangelisches Gesangbuch (EG 214), and in a different version in the Catholic Gotteslob (GL 215).

History 
Text and melody are based on a Leise, a German congregational refrain ending on Kyrie eleison, of the Latin sequence Lauda Sion for Corpus Christi. Luther knew it in a version which first appeared at the end of the 14th century in a processional from the Franciscan monastery Miltenberg, made in Mainz, at the end of the 14th century:

Luther praised the Leise in his writing Von der Winkelmesse und Pfaffenweihe in 1533, appreciating that it is focused on the sacrament of bread and wine, not on sacrifice. He made it a song of thanks after communion, by shortening the text for a first stanza, and by adding two stanzas. The second stanza mentions the anamnesis of the gifts of redemption, the third stanza is a prayer for spiritual fruits of the sacrament for the individual life of the Christian, and for the community.

Luther's version appeared in the Erfurt Enchiridion of 1524 and in Johann Walter's choral hymnal Eyn geystlich Gesangk Buchleyn the same year. In the current German hymnal Evangelisches Gesangbuch, it appears as EG 214.

Lyrics 

The hymn is in three stanzas of eight lines each, with "Kyrieleis" repeated every four lines.

Music 
Johann Walter published a four-part setting of the melody in Eyn geystlich Gesangk Buchleyn in 1524. Johann Sebastian Bach composed a four-part setting, BWV 322.

Catholic version 
Luther's first stanza, including his redaction, appeared in a Catholic hymnal by the Dominican Michael Vehe, New Gesangbüchlin Geistlicher Lieder, in Halle in 1537. In this hymnal, the song is continued by four more stanzas which are attributed to Caspar Querhammer. This version entered several subsequent hymnals.

In the 20th century, a new version appeared in hymnals such as Kirchenlied, which took Luther's first stanza unchanged, but the second half of his second and third stanza replaced each time by the second half of the first, as a refrain. At first, Luther's name was not mentioned, instead only "16th century". This version was included in the first common Catholic hymnal Gotteslob of 1975 (as GL 494), now mentioning Luther's name,
 and was kept in the following edition, Gotteslob, as GL 215.

See also 
 List of hymns by Martin Luther

References

Cited works

External links 

 Gott sei gelobet und gebenedeiet BWV 322; BC F 76.1 / Chorale Bach Digital
 Gott sei gelobet und gebenedeiet Gotteslob
 Gotteslobvideo (GL 215): Gott sei gelobet und gebenedeiet katholisch.de/video

16th century in music
Hymn tunes
Hymns by Martin Luther